

Buildings and structures

Buildings
 1030 – Speyer Cathedral, Germany, initiated by Emperor Konrad II.
 1032 – Santa Maria de Ripoll, Catalonia is consecrated.
 1033 – St. Michael's Church, Hildesheim, Holy Roman Empire, completed and consecrated.
 1034 – The Saviour Cathedral of Chernihiv
 1036 – Al-Aqsa Mosque in Jerusalem restored and renovated by the Fatimid caliph after an earthquake in 1033.
 1037 – Chartres Cathedral in France consecrated for the fifth time (building destroyed today).
 1037 – St Sophia Cathedral in Kiev founded.

References

11th-century architecture
Architecture